Dominic Lockhart (born July 3, 1994) is a German professional basketball player for Niners Chemnitz of the Basketball Bundesliga (BBL).

Professional career
Lockhart played his youth basketball with the Gießen 46ers. He joined the EWE Baskets Oldenburg in 2013. In 2017, he signed with BG Göttingen. Lockhart averaged 6.4 points, 3.2 rebounds and 1.7 assists per game in the 2017-18 season. On May 30, 2018, he signed a two-year extension with the team.

On July 14, 2020, he has signed with Brose Bamberg of the Basketball Bundesliga (BBL).

On June 16, 2022, Lockhart signed with Niners Chemnitz of the Basketball Bundesliga.

International career
Lockhart was a part of the German U-17, U-18 and U-20 national team.

References

1994 births
Living people
BG Göttingen players
Brose Bamberg players
EWE Baskets Oldenburg players
German men's basketball players
Giessen 46ers players
NINERS Chemnitz players
People from Schweinfurt
Sportspeople from Lower Franconia
Shooting guards